Ahmednagar may refer to:
 India
 Ahmednagar, a city in Ahmednagar District in the state of Maharashtra, India
 Ahmednagar Sultanate
 Ahmednagar District
 Ahmednagar railway station

 Pakistan
 Ahmadnagar, Chiniot
 Ahmadnagar